Melli is an Italian surname. People with the surname include:

Alessandro Melli (born 1969), Italian footballer
Elide Melli (born 1952) is an Italian actress
Nello Melli (1923–1986), Argentine film editor
Nicolò Melli (born 1991), Italian professional basketball player
Rina Melli (1882–1958), Italian socialist activist and journalist
Roberto Melli (1885–1958), Italian painter and sculptor

See also
Melli (Spanish footballer) birth name Juan Alberto Andreu Alvarado (born 1984), Spanish footballer
Melli (disambiguation)

Surnames of Italian origin